Goy is a word used in Hebrew, Yiddish and English to mean a non-Jew.

Goy may also refer to:
 Goy (surname), a list of people with the surname
 Gang of Youths, an Australian alternative rock band
 't Goy, a village in the Netherlands

See also
 GOJ (disambiguation)
 Goi (disambiguation)
 Shabbos goy, a person who assists Jews by performing certain acts for them on the Jewish Sabbath
 Giy (disambiguation)
 G0y